Fernández Racing was a Mexican motor racing team that competed in the American Le Mans Series, Champ Car, the IRL IndyCar Series, and the Rolex Sports Car Series. The team was co-founded by Adrian Fernández and Tom Anderson in 2001.

Open wheel

The team competed in the Champ Car ranks with Fernández and Shinji Nakano driving. In 2003 they downsized to one car, dropping Nakano, but scored their first victory at Portland International Raceway. A late decision just prior to the start of 2004 saw Fernández Racing switch ranks, as many other teams did during a tumultuous two-year period, from Champ Car to the IndyCar Series. Adrian won three races that year, at Kentucky Speedway, Chicagoland Speedway and California Speedway.

In 2005 Fernández himself only drove at the Indianapolis 500 in a joint effort with Mo Nunn Racing. The team had two branches under their banner: Delphi Fernandez Racing, which ran Scott Sharp, and Super Aguri Fernandez Racing, co-owned by Aguri Suzuki, that ran Kosuke Matsuura. The team has also branched into the Grand-Am ranks, under the Lowe's Fernandez Racing guise, fielding a Daytona Prototype for drivers Fernandez and Mario Haberfeld.

For 2007, Fernández ended his involvement in both the IndyCar Series and Grand-Am series, with his partner Aguri Suzuki and driver Kosuke Matsuura leaving to join Panther Racing in the IndyCar Series.

American Le Mans Series

In 2007, Fernández Racing became one of three factory supported teams in Acura's new LMP2 project in the American Le Mans Series. Fernández was chosen as the primary engine development team. Through the 2007 season, the team ran a Lola B07/40 chassis, with Highcroft Racing and Andretti Green Racing running heavily modified Courage chassis in order to compare the engine's performance relative to other Lola teams. In the team's ALMS debut at the 2007 12 Hours of Sebring, drivers Adrian Fernández and Luis Díaz finished third overall and second in the LMP2 class, behind the Andretti-Green Acura. After a strong start to the 2008 season for Acura, the Penske Racing Porsche RS Spyders would dominate the rest of the season claiming the next eleven races including eight overall victories. The team finished their debut season fourth in the LMP2 Teams' Championship with Fernández and Díaz eleventh in the Drivers' Championship.

For 2008, the team raced the updated Courage-derived Acura ARX-01b just as the other Acura teams. The 2008 season saw titanic battle between the LMP2 Acura and Porsche teams, and the LMP1 Factory Audi Sport North America team. Despite their consistent pace, the team's best result came as a second place at Mosport. The team finished the season 5th in the LMP2 Teams' Championship with Adrian Fernández and Luis Díaz 12th in the Drivers' Championship.

In 2009, Highcroft Racing and de Ferran Motorsports moved up to the LMP1 class, leaving Fernández Racing as the only Acura team in LMP2. By season's end, the team finished first in the P2 Teams' Championship ahead of their main rival Dyson Racing with Fernández and Díaz first in the Drivers' Championship. 2009 would be the final season of competition for the Fernández Racing with the team leaving American Le Mans Series competition. However, HPD would continue to develop the ARX line of LMP1 and LMP2 prototypes.

Drivers

CART
 Adrian Fernández
 Shinji Nakano
 Max Papis
 Luis Díaz (2 races)

IRL IndyCar Series
 Scott Sharp
 Kosuke Matsuura
 Adrian Fernández

Grand-Am/ALMS
 Adrian Fernández (Grand Am & ALMS 2006-)
 Mario Haberfeld (Grand-Am)
 Luis Díaz (ALMS 2007-)

Racing results

Complete CART FedEx Championship Series results
(key) (results in bold indicate pole position) (results in italics indicate fastest lap)

 The Firestone Firehawk 600 was canceled after qualifying due to excessive g-forces on the drivers.

Complete IRL IndyCar Series results
(key)

IndyCar wins

External links 
 Official Site

Champ Car teams
IndyCar Series teams
Grand American Road Racing Association teams
American Le Mans Series teams
American auto racing teams
Mexican auto racing teams
Auto racing teams established in 2001